Kalles Kaviar (known as Kallen Mätitahna in Finland) is a Swedish brand of smörgåskaviar.

It is manufactured by Abba Seafood. Kalles Kaviar is mainly made of salted cod roe (Gadus morhua), sugar, canola oil and spices. It is officially credited as having been introduced in 1954, but probably existed even earlier as advertisment for the product appeared in newspapers as early as 1950. The product soon became considered a classic product in the Swedish market, internationally recognised as a Swedish product.

The tube label has maintained the same design from the beginning, and depicts the son of the then-CEO of the manufacturing company, Carl Ameln. The name Kalle was used because it was a popular name in the 1950s when it was first created. 

The tube had to be made of aluminium rather than plastic because kaviar cannot stay fresh when in contact with air, and plastic tubes become filled with air when the contents have been squeezed out, whereas aluminium remains in the form it was pressed into. 

In 2011, IKEA replaced Kalles Kaviar with its own brand of caviar. This led to backlash, leading to IKEA returning the product to its shelves within a few years.

In the 21st century, the Swedish smörgåskaviar market has fractured, with each supermarket chain promoting its own brand.

References

Brand name condiments
Swedish cuisine
Roe